Catacore kolyma, the Kolyma eighty-eight, is the only species in the genus Catacore. It is a member of the brush-footed butterfly family and is found in the Neotropical realm, ranging from Colombia to Peru.

Subspecies
C. k. kolyma (Ecuador, Peru, Brazil: Mato Grosso, Amazonas)
C. k. pasithea (Hewitson, 1864) (Ecuador)

References

Kolyma Eighty-eight, Neotropical Butterflies

Biblidinae
Nymphalidae of South America
Monotypic butterfly genera
Nymphalidae genera